Sustainable markets are defined as systems or institutions where the exchange of goods and services occurs with a sustainable, ethical, and environmentalist mindset. Sustainable markets differ from traditional economic markets as they aim to diminish the effects of natural resource degradation, environmental pollution, and safe labor practices.

Transition to sustainable markets 

In order to transition to sustainable markets, the use of market governance mechanisms (MGMs) to change the behavior of economic actors has been considered. Examples of sustainable market MGMs include fair trade certifications, sustainable production reporting, carbon taxes, pollution control subsidies, and payments for ecosystem services.

Progress 

In the past, the sustainable market discussion was limited only to theorizing how to best reach sustainability goals like carbon neutrality. However, in 2022 California governor Gavin Newsom signed The California Climate Commitment which promised to make California Carbon Neutral by 2045. Over the next two decades, the Climate Commitment aims to:

 Create 4 million new jobs
 Cut air pollution by 60%
 Reduce state oil consumption by 91%
 Save California $23 billion by avoiding the damages of pollution
 Reduce fossil fuel use in buildings and transportation by 92%
 Cut refinery pollution by 94%

As much of the rest of the world decides to move forward, they can look to the Climate Commitment for ideas on how to proceed with sustainable markets.

Debates 
As more legislation such as the California Climate Commitment becomes commonplace, there are also questions of whether it is ethical to impose market restrictions on developing countries. Many developing countries will be hit the hardest by climate change. This causes some to say that the weight of stopping climate change is in their hands, however, others argue that because developing countries are the leading cause of climate change, it is up to them to solve the crisis.
Furthermore, there are unresolved debates over how much regulation or government intervention is appropriate in order to govern sustainable markets, including the use of ecotaxes.

Broader questions remain over the ability of sustainable markets to fully account for environmental costs, such as pollution and ecosystem collapse. Debates about the main focus of economic models, such as GDP or social wellbeing, also exist. There have been suggestions that a move away from a GDP focus is required for environmental prosperity.

Organizations 

A number of organizations are working in the sustainable markets field.

 The International Institute for Environment and Development's Sustainable Markets Group develops research and analysis towards sustainable markets and the debates and innovations shaping markets. This research also includes a database of market governance mechanisms. 
 The U.S-based Skoll Foundation runs a program on sustainable markets which focuses on areas such as responsible supply chains, access to finance for sustainable small and medium enterprises, and work on environmental standards and certification.
 The International Institute for Sustainable Development runs the Sustainable Markets and Responsible Trade initiative. This focuses on the sustainability of international trade, the design, and implementation of supply chains.
 The Mistra Center for Sustainable Markets (Misum), based at Stockholm School of Economics, aims to provide policy research and advice to Swedish and international actors. Misum is a cross-disciplinary and multi-stakeholder knowledge center dedicated to sustainability and sustainable markets and contains three research platforms: Sustainability in Financial Markets, Sustainability in Production, and Consumption & Sustainable Socio-Economic Development.

References

Markets
Sustainable development
Environmentalism